In Darkness is a 2011 Polish drama film written by David F. Shamoon and directed by Agnieszka Holland. It was nominated for Best Foreign Language Film at the 84th Academy Awards.

Based on true events during German occupation of Poland, the film tells about Leopold Socha, a sewer worker in the Polish city of Lwów. He used his knowledge of the city's sewer system to shelter a group of Jews who had escaped from the Lwów Ghetto during the Holocaust in Poland.

Plot 
In Darkness is a dramatization of a rescue of Jewish refugees during World War II in the German-occupied city Lwów (Lemberg in German, L'viv in Ukrainian). For over a year, a Polish Catholic sewer maintenance worker and burglar, Leopold Socha along with his friend and co-worker Szczepek Wróblewski, hid and cared for a group of Polish Jews who had escaped the massacres and deportations during the liquidation of the Lwów Ghetto. At first the men demand daily payment for their help but they continue to aid the group long after the Jews' money has run out and aiding them had become ever more dangerous. The Jewish ghetto had been established in 1941 and the Nazis decided to liquidate it in June 1943. The Soviets took over Lwów city in July 1944, by which point Socha's band made up 10 of the fewer than 1,000 surviving Jews in the city. Socha's and Wróblewski's actions and those of their wives led to their recognition as Righteous Among the Nations recipients.

Cast 
 Robert Więckiewicz as Leopold Socha
 Benno Fürmann as Mundek Margulies
 Agnieszka Grochowska as Klara Keller
 Maria Schrader as Paulina Chiger
 Herbert Knaup as Ignacy Chiger
 Kinga Preis as Wanda Socha
 Krzysztof Skonieczny as Szczepek Wróblewski
 Julia Kijowska as Chaja
 Marcin Bosak as Janek Weiss
 Jerzy Walczak as Jakob Berestycki
 Michał Żurawski as Bortnik
 Piotr Głowacki as Jacek Frenkiel
 Zofia Pieczyńska as Stefcia Socha
 Etel Szyc as Szona Grossman
 Andrzej Mastalerz as Sawicki
 Ida Łozińska as Rachela Grossman
 Laura Lo Zito as Irena
 Alexander Levit as Kovalev
 Frank Köbe as Gustav Wilhaus

Production and release 
Dedicated to Marek Edelman, the film is a Polish-German-Canadian coproduction, with a screenplay by Canadian writer David F. Shamoon. In Darkness is based on the book In the Sewers of Lvov (1990) by Robert Marshall. The last survivor of the group, Krystyna Chiger, published a memoir of her experience, The Girl in the Green Sweater: A Life in Holocaust's Shadow (2008). It was not a source for the film, as Holland was unaware of the book prior to the film's release  This was the first full-length film shown at the 23rd Polish Film Festival in America in Chicago on the Opening Night Gala.

Reception 
As of October 2020, a majority of film critics have given the film a positive review. In Darkness has an approval rating of 88% on review aggregator website Rotten Tomatoes, based on 114 reviews, and an average rating of 7.60/10. It also has a score of 74 out of 100 on Metacritic, based on 36 critics, indicating "generally favorable reviews".

A review by Lisa Schwarzbaum of Entertainment Weekly called it "a harrowing nail-biter of a movie". Ella Taylor of NPR wrote In Darkness "satisfies for the intensity of the performances and for the artful contrasting of life on the teeming streets of L'viv with life and death in the dim, rat-infested sewers", adding that it "is often a thrilling adventure picture — as if Anne Frank had found an Inglourious Basterd to help her make The Great Escape". Ty Burr of The Boston Globe called the film "a harrowing Holocaust tale, but one that speaks to humankind's capacity to endure, to fight on in the face of terrible cruelty", adding that Holland "elicits taut performances from a strong cast". David Denby of The New Yorker called it "the most volatile that Holland has directed. With a distinguished, hardworking cast of German and Polish actors", noting that "honesty is the movie's greatest strength". Todd McCarthy of The Hollywood Reporter said this "harrowing, engrossing, claustrophobic and sometimes literally hard to watch […] robust, arduous drama is more ironic and multi-faceted than most such tales and should be well received by the considerable art house audience worldwide partial to the subject matter". Joe Morgenstern of The Wall Street Journal said this "brave epic" film's "suspense, derived from a true story, is excruciating and inspiring in equal measure". A. O. Scott of The New York Times called In Darkness "suspenseful, horrifying and at times intensely moving […] touching, warm and dramatically satisfying". On the other hand, Roger Ebert of the Chicago Sun-Times dismissed the film as redundant and inferior to Schindler's List which was "more entertaining" in his view. Michael Atkinson of the Village Voice claimed that "Holland does skirt the ethical entrapment of Schindler's List (over-lionizing the Aryan rescuer)", adding: "It's not fair, but there it is: We've been here before." The German authorities in occupied Poland referred to non-Jews, including Poles, as Aryans; colloquially, documents proving one's non-Jewish identity were called "Aryan papers", and the areas prohibited to Jews were known collectively as "the Aryan side". the Polish districts of citi David Edelstein of New York Magazine wrote: "In outline, In Darkness is a standard conversion melodrama, but little within those parameters is easy. The darkness lingers into the light." Mick LaSalle of San Francisco Chronicle called it "an extraordinary movie, and somehow good art […] a gripping piece of history and also an exploration into the mysteries of the human soul", and gave it "the highest recommendation".

Awards 
In Darkness was nominated for the Best Foreign Language Film at the 84th Academy Awards. Nominated alongside the official Canadian nominee Monsieur Lazhar, it attracted attention in the country for marking the first time in the history of Cinema of Canada that had its two films nominated for the best foreign language film Oscar in the same year. At the International Valladolid Film Festival (SEMINCI), Agnieszka Holland won the award for Best Director. The film garnered several award nominations at the 32nd Genie Awards, including Best Adapted Screenplay for Shamoon. It also received the Grand Prix at the 7th Batumi International Art-house Film Festival.

See also
 Europa Europa, Agnieszka Holland's 1990 film about Solomon Perel
 Rescue of Jews by Poles during the Shoah
 Polish Righteous among the Nations
 List of submissions to the 84th Academy Awards for best foreign language film
 List of Polish submissions for the Academy Award for best foreign language film
 The Girl in the Green Sweater: A Life in Holocaust's Shadow, a memoir by one of those Mr. Socha saved

References

External links 
 
 
 

2011 war drama films
2011 films
2010s historical drama films
Canadian war drama films
Films directed by Agnieszka Holland
German war drama films
2010s German-language films
2010s Polish-language films
Ukrainian-language films
Polish war drama films
Holocaust films
Films set in the 1940s
World War II films based on actual events
Polish historical drama films
History of Poland on film
Films set in Ukraine
Yiddish-language films
German World War II films
Polish World War II films
Sony Pictures Classics films
2011 multilingual films
Canadian multilingual films
German multilingual films
Polish multilingual films
Canadian World War II films
2010s Canadian films
2010s German films
Films about Polish resistance during World War II